The Game Bakers is an independent game studio based in Montpellier, France. The company are known for creating games for mobile devices including Squids and Combo Crew, but have recently shifted their focus to console and PC games, with Furi.

History
The Game Bakers were formed in 2010 by two former employees of Ubisoft, who worked on AAA licenses, Emeric Thoa and Audrey Leprince. The idea was to "make games as we cook: with a lot of love."
The Game Bakers started by developing games for mobile devices and then decided to focus on consoles and computers games. In 2016, they released Furi.

Games developed

Awards

EIGD Art Direction Award – Squids
Apple's Editor Choice – Combo Crew

References

External links
Official site

Video game companies established in 2010
Video game companies of France
Video game development companies
Companies based in Occitania (administrative region)
Montpellier
French companies established in 2010
Indie video game developers
Privately held companies of France